Dyckia ibiramensis is a plant species in the genus Dyckia. This species is endemic to Brazil.

References

ibiramensis
Endemic flora of Brazil
Flora of the Atlantic Forest